Erigeron breweri is a North American species of flowering plants in the family Asteraceae known by the common name Brewer's fleabane.

Erigeron breweri is native to the western United States in the states of California and Nevada, where it grows in many varied habitats, from mountains to grassland and desert. It is a perennial herb reaching anywhere from 10 to 70 centimeters (4-28 inches) in height with evenly spaced small leaves along its hairy stems. The flower heads are around one centimeter (0.4 inches) wide with centers of golden yellow or greenish disc florets and most heads have a fringe of purple ray florets.

Varieties
 Erigeron breweri var. bisanctus  G.Nesom - San Gabriel + San Bernardino Mountains
 Erigeron breweri var. breweri - Nevada, mountains of California (primarily Sierra Nevada) from Shasta County to San Bernardino County
 Erigeron breweri var. covillei (Greene) G.L.Nesom - southern California from Inyo County to San Diego County
 Erigeron breweri var. jacinteus (H.M.Hall) Cronquist - southern California from Kern County to Riverside County
 Erigeron breweri var. porphyreticus (M.E.Jones) Cronquist mountains of California from Alpine County to Riverside County

References

External links
Jepson Manual Treatment
United States Department of Agriculture Plants Profile
Calphotos photo gallery, University of CaliforniaPhoto gallery

breweri
Flora of California
Flora of Nevada
Plants described in 1865
Flora without expected TNC conservation status